Urban Fest Osijek or UFO is an international festival of urban music held annually in Osijek, Croatia. It has been held since 2004. In 2009 it was proclaimed for the best demo festival in Croatia in 2008-09 year.

See also
List of electronic music festivals
Live electronic music

References

External links 
  

Urban Fest
Recurring events established in 2004
Croatian popular music
Electronic music festivals in Croatia
Hip hop music festivals
2004 establishments in Croatia
Summer events in Croatia
Tourist attractions in Osijek